The Opel RAK e is an electric two-seat city concept car produced by the German car manufacturer Opel. The RAK e premiered at the 2911 Frankfurt Motor Show. The name RAK e recalls the name of the rocket-powered RAK 2 from 1928, which included a canopy door. It was developed and designed in conjunction with KISKA, who also designed the KTM X-Bow.

The usable battery has the capacity of 5 kWh.

References

External links

 Opel RAK e on GM Authority

RAK e
Cars introduced in 2011
Electric city cars
City cars
Hatchbacks